Inekon T8M-700IT is a tram produced by Inekon based on the T6M-700 model of Tramkar. A total number of 18 trams were produced. They entered service in Sofia in 2009.

References 

Transport in Sofia
Tramkar trams